Neocarenum is a genus of beetles in the family Carabidae, containing the following species:

 Neocarenum angustatum Sloane, 1894
 Neocarenum blackburni Sloane, 1895
 Neocarenum cylindripenne H. W. Bates, 1874
 Neocarenum dingo Sloane, 1916
 Neocarenum elongatum (W. J. Macleay, 1864)
 Neocarenum parviceps Sloane, 1894
 Neocarenum retusum H. W. Bates, 1874
 Neocarenum rugosulum W. J. Macleay, 1869
 Neocarenum singulare Laporte, 1867
 Neocarenum spenceri Sloane, 1897

References

Scaritinae